Kovel is a railway hub of the Rivne directory of Lviv Railways.

Along with Zabolottia railway station also serves as a rail border checkpoint at Belarus-Ukraine border.

Kovel Station also has rail yard and locomotive depot.

Gallery

References

External links
 Kovel station at railwayz.info (photos) 
 Rumyantseva, N. Kovel station. Tokatema.ru 

Buildings and structures in Volyn Oblast
Kovel
Railway stations in Volyn Oblast
Lviv Railways stations
Belarus–Ukraine border crossings
Rail yards in Ukraine